This is a list of notable vendors of enterprise portals. An enterprise portal is a framework for integrating information, people and processes across organizational boundaries.

enterprise portal vendors